Carpentersville is an unincorporated community in Franklin Township, Putnam County, in the U.S. state of Indiana.

History
Carpentersville was laid out about 1840 by Philip Carpenter, and named for him. A post office was established at Carpentersville in 1850, and remained in operation until it was discontinued in 1910.

Geography

References

Unincorporated communities in Putnam County, Indiana
Unincorporated communities in Indiana